The 2021 FAI Cup Final, known as the 2021 Extra.ie FAI Cup Final for sponsorship reasons, was the final match of the 2021 FAI Cup, the national association football cup of the Republic of Ireland. The match took place on Sunday 28 November at the Aviva Stadium in Dublin, and was contested by  St Patrick's Athletic and Bohemians.
St Patrick's Athletic captained by Ian Bermingham won the game 4–3 on penalties after a 1–1 draw in which both Chris Forrester and Rory Feely scored against their former clubs.

Prematch 
St Patrick's Athletic were looking to win their fourth FAI Cup after winning in 1959, 1961, and 2014. Bohemians were looking to win their eight FAI Cup after winning in 1927–28, 1934–35, 1969–70, 1975–76, 1991–92, 2000–01, 2008. The final was the first since 2014 to not feature Dundalk who were looking to reach their seventh final in a row.

The match was broadcast live on RTÉ Two and RTÉ Two HD in the Republic of Ireland, and via the RTÉ Player worldwide.

Match details

References

External links
Official Site

FAI Cup finals
Fai Cup Final 2021
Fai Cup Final 2021